Smallman is an English surname. Notable people with the surname include:

 Basil Smallman (1921–2001), English music scholar
 David Smallman (born 1953), Welsh footballer 
 Raymond Smallman (1929–2015), British metallurgist and academic
 William Smallman (1615–1643), English politician

English-language surnames